The 1995 Open 13 was a men's Association of Tennis Professionals tennis tournament held in Marseille, France, and played on indoor carpet courts. The event was part of the World Series of the 1995 ATP Tour. It was the third edition of the tournament and was held from 6 February to 13 February 1995. First-seeded Boris Becker won the singles title.

Finals

Singles

 Boris Becker defeated  Daniel Vacek 6–7(2–7), 6–4, 7–5
 It was Becker's 1st title of the year and the 43rd of his career.

Doubles

 David Adams /  Andrei Olhovskiy defeated  Jean-Philippe Fleurian /  Rodolphe Gilbert 6–1, 6–4
 It was Adams's 1st title of the year and the 7th of his career. It was Olhovskiy's 1st title of the year and the 8th of his career.

References

External links
 Official website 
 ATP tournament profile
 ITF tournament edition details

Open 13
Open 13
Carpet court tennis tournaments
Open 13